Yule Island is a small island in Central Province, Papua New Guinea. It is located 160 km NW from Port Moresby, on the south coast of Papua New Guinea.

History

Yule Island was probably named after Charles Bampfield Yule, a Royal Navy officer who surveyed the area from 1842–1845.  It was one of the first areas in Central Province to have contact with Europeans. The Catholic Missionaries of the Sacred Heart began a mission in 1885. The mission was successfully led from 1900 to 1945 by Bishop Henry Verius.

With the European missionaries came catechists from the Philippines, some of which married into the local population. Today, many inhabitants of Yule Island have distinct European and Filipino features.

The visit of Australian poet James McAuley to the mission at Yule Island in 1949 made a profound spiritual impression on him and contributed to his conversion to Catholicism.

Fauna
Yule Island is surrounded by coral reefs.

Several spider species are endemic to this island, including:
 The jumping spider species Salticus perogaster and Plexippus brachypus
 Heteropoda cyanognatha and Pandercetes longipes (Sparassidae)
 Misumena arrogans and Stephanopis yulensis (Thomisidae)

The Early Pliocene Echinodermata fauna is rich and diverse, with 19 species known to occur in the Kairuku Formation. Nearly half of these species are also represented in northern Australia stocks, with the northern Great Barrier Reef only 600 km away.

Notable people
 Susan Karike - designer of the flag of Papua New Guinea
 Louis-André Navarre - Missionary of the Sacred Heart and Archbishop, worked on the island and, following his death and burial in Townsville, was exhumed and reburied on the island

References

 Papua New Guinea Tourism Promotion Authority: Central Province 
 (2007): The world spider catalog, version 8.0. American Museum of Natural History.

Further reading

  (2003): Echinoids of the Kairuku Formation (Lower Pliocene), Yule Island, Papua New Guinea: Clypeasteroida. Regularia. Spatangoida. Proceedings of the Linnean Society of New South Wales 124: 125–162.
  (2004): The Yule Island fauna and the origin of tropical northern Australian echinoid (Echinodermata) faunas. Proceedings of the Linnean Society of New South Wales 125: 97-109.

Islands of Papua New Guinea
Central Province (Papua New Guinea)